Harish Verma is an Indian actor who mostly works in Punjabi-language films. He made his debut in the 2010 film Panjaban, and gained wide attention with Yaar Annmulle (2011). He made his singing debut with the track Ikk Vaari Hor Soch Lae, which was written by Jaani and produced by B Praak

Filmography

Singles

Television

References

External links

Year of birth missing (living people)
Living people
Male actors in Punjabi cinema
Male actors from Chandigarh
Male actors from Mumbai